A runner is a person who runs.

Runner may also refer to:

Arts and entertainment

Film and television
 Runner, the most junior member(s) of a film crew or member(s) of a television crew
 Runner, a film by the British artist Ravi Deepres
 Runner (Stargate), a type of character in the fictional Stargate universe
 "Runner" (Stargate Atlantis), an episode of the television series Stargate Atlantis
 "Runner" (The Professionals), an episode of the crime-action television drama series
 Runner (Logans Run), a type of character in the film Logan's Run

Music
 Runner (album), a 2012 studio album by The Sea and Cake
 Runner (band), a short-lived British rock band, formed in 1978
 "Runner" (song), a 1981 song by Canadian musician Ian Thomas, also by Manfred Mann's Earth Band in 1984
 The Runners (production duo), an American electronic and hip hop production duo
 "The Runner" (song), a 2019 song by Foals
 "Runner", a 2017 song by Why Don't We
 "Runner", a 2022 song by Alex G from the album God Save the Animals

Other media
 Runner (comics), a Marvel Comics character
 Sonic Runners, a video game

Biology
 Any of several fishes of the family Carangidae called runners
 Stolon, an aerial shoot from a plant with the ability to produce adventitious roots and new clones, often called a runner

Communication
 Courier, a person who delivers messages, packages, and mail
 Runner (soldier), a military courier carrying messages by foot

People
 George Runner, California Board of Equalization member and former State Senator (and husband of Sharon Runner)
 Sharon Runner, California State Senator (and wife of George Runner)

Sport
 Athletic shoe, footwear primarily designed for sports or other forms of physical exercise
 Baserunner, an offensive player in baseball who has successfully reached at least first base
 Runner (cricket), a player who runs for an injured batsman
 Sling (climbing equipment), climbing equipment consisting of a tied or sewn loop of webbing that can be wrapped around a rock
 An employee of a sports agent, usually responsible for scouting and befriending potential future clients

Transportation
 The long, flat, smooth ski-like glide on a sled
 Gilera Runner, a moped/scooter manufactured by Gilera
 USS Runner (SS-275), Gato-class submarine, 1942–1943
 USS Runner (SS-476), Tench-class submarine, 1944–1971

Other uses 
 "Runner", a member of the Beguny subset of the Bezpopovtsy religious movement
 Runner (casting), a channel in the gating system of a casting die
 Runner rug, a long, narrow rectangular carpet
 Running gag, a literary device in the form of a repeated joke or reference
 The rotating driven element of a water turbine (hydroelectric) generator
 Terrestrial locomotion

See also
 Run (disambiguation)
 Running (disambiguation)
 The Runner (disambiguation)
 The Runners (disambiguation)